Gleimia europaea is a bacterium from the genus Gleimia. Gleimia europaea can cause cases of bacteraemia in  very rare cases. Gleimia europaea is formerly known as Actinomyces europaeus. It comes from the domain of gram-positive actinobacteria.

References

Actinomycetales
Bacteria described in 1997